Phoebe Millicent Hearst Cooke (July 13, 1927 – November 18, 2012) was an American businesswoman and philanthropist. She served on the board of directors of the Hearst Corporation from 1962 to 1998. She was a granddaughter of William Randolph Hearst. Her twin brother was former Hearst Corporation chairman George Randolph Hearst Jr., who died in June 2012.

She spent much of her life in Woodside, California, and was particularly involved in the equestrian community, including horse-assisted therapy through the National Center For Equine Facilitated Therapy.

In her elder years, she faced disputes with family over the management of her estate, which concluded in 2009 with a conservatorship.

In 1996, she was inducted into the Hall of Great Westerners of the National Cowboy & Western Heritage Museum.

References

1927 births
2012 deaths
American billionaires
Hearst family
Businesspeople from San Francisco
American media executives
20th-century American businesspeople
20th-century American businesswomen
20th-century American philanthropists
People from Woodside, California